The Rame Peninsula  is a peninsula in south-east Cornwall. The peninsula is surrounded by the English Channel to the south, Plymouth Sound to the east, the Hamoaze to the northeast and the estuary of the River Lynher to the northwest. On a clear day, the Atlantic Ocean can be seen from advantageous points from Rame Head. The largest settlement is Torpoint, which is on the eastern coast, facing Devonport in Plymouth, Devon.

The peninsula is named after Rame Head, to the south of the peninsula. The peninsula also includes the village and parish of Rame.  The entire area of the peninsula is designated an Area of Outstanding Natural Beauty.

Settlements

Other places on the peninsula include: Antony, Cawsand, Crafthole, Cremyll, Fourlanesend, Freathy, Higher Wilcove, Kingsand, Lower Tregantle, Maker, Millbrook, Mount Edgcumbe House, Mount Edgcumbe Country Park, Penlee, Portwrinkle, Sheviock, and St John and Withnoe Barton. Kingsand and Cawsand are protected by the headland. Much of the peninsula is owned by the Mount Edgcumbe estate which also includes Mount Edgcumbe Country Park.

County history
Until boundary reform in the 19th century a part of the peninsula was part of Devon, not Cornwall. The Counties (Detached Parts) Act 1844 transferred parts of Maker and St John, ensuring those parishes (and the peninsula) were entirely in Cornwall. These manors had been possessions of Tavistock Abbey from Norman times.

See also

Forgotten Corner of Cornwall

Footnotes

External links
Caradon District Council on the peninsula
Pictures of the Rame Peninsula as it is today
Pictures of Rame from yesteryear
Rame Peninsula - official site of Rame's AONB status
National Coastwatch Institution at Rame Head
Rame Heritage

Peninsulas of Cornwall
Places formerly in Devon